José Ozámiz y Fortich (May 5, 1898 – February 11, 1944) was a Spanish Filipino lawyer and politician from Misamis Occidental.

Early life
Ozámiz was born on May 5, 1898 in house near the “old bridge” in Moran to Jenaro Ozámiz from Navarre, Spain and Basilisa Fortich, a Filipino mestizo of Spanish and Cebuano ancestry. Jenaro left Spain at age sixteen and came to Moran, then ended up at the Municipality of Jimenez and engaged in the business of abacá and copra trading which made him very rich, acquiring through the years  in tile province and  ranch in Bukidnon. José spoke his first languages Spanish, Cebuano, Tagalog and English when Philippines came under American rule.

He was the oldest and the only son among ten children. His sisters are Pacita, Consuelo, Carmen, Pilar, Remedios, Nieves, Mercedes, Paulita, and Lourdes. Three of Jose's sisters Consuelo, Cannon and Nieves remained distinct and never got married. Two entered politics: one was Consuelo, who was a councilor for six terms in Jimenez and Remedios who became a Congresswoman of Bukidnon. Remedios’ son, Carlos Fortich became a politician also by becoming a governor of Bukidnon.

In 1904, the Ozámiz family transferred to a big house in Jimenez, where they engage themselves in the copra business and ship them off to other islands in the Philippines.

Legal career
Ozámiz graduated from Ateneo de Manila and became a lawyer on September 27, 1921. Actively practiced law, he was a counsel of big companies in Manila, like Madrigal Shipping and Dela Rama Steamship, both owned by senators.

Political career
Ozámiz was appointed as Misamis Occidental's first provincial governor and served from 1928 to 1931. He was later elected as representative of the Lone District of Misamis Occidental from 1931 to 1941. He was a delegate to the 1935 Constitutional Convention that resulted in the creation of the 1935 Constitution for the Philippine Commonwealth Government. In 1941, he was elected to the Philippine Senate. However, he did not serve his term as senator due to Imperial Japan invading in the Philippines during World War II and he was executed before he could assume office.

World War II
When the Japanese occupied the country during World War II, Ozámiz was among those who accepted a post in the Japanese government with the blessings of the guerrilla movement who saw that his position would allow him to move discreetly. He became chairperson of the Games and Amusement Board. Then in May 1943, he came to Mindanao to contact Fertig. He came by boat accompanied by Jose Maria and Pelong Campos of Aloran. During his arrival in Mindanao, he met Fertig and Parson, both major leaders of the guerrilla movement.

On his way home, Ozámiz's family was under house arrest. He went back to Manila in February 1944. He was arrested by Japanese Kempetai on February 11 on his wife's birthday. He was condemned to be executed. A Filipino nicknamed "makapili" played a part in his downfall along with twenty-nine other fellow Filipino who also got arrested at the same time. They were the core of the guerilla movement in Manila. On the same day, he was beheaded at the Manila North Cemetery, alongside 29 guerilla members, by the Japanese during their occupation of the Philippines during World War II for his involvement in the Resistance Movement.

Legacy
 The city of Ozamiz (which used to be called Misamis) in the province of Misamis Occidental was posthumously named in his honor.
 Then Nailon Primary School of Nailon, Tudela, Misamis Occidental was renamed after him, which is now Ozamiz Elementary School in Camarin, Cabol-anonan, Tudela, Misamis Occidental (Barangay Cabol-anonan was once part of Barangay Nailon).

References

External links
Biography page of Senator José Ozámiz at the OzamizCity.com website

1898 births
1944 deaths
Governors of Misamis Occidental
Members of the House of Representatives of the Philippines from Misamis Occidental
Senators of the 1st Congress of the Commonwealth of the Philippines
Nacionalista Party politicians
Executed politicians
Filipino people of Spanish descent
Filipino people of Basque descent
Filipino people of Catalan descent
Cebuano people
Visayan people
People from Misamis Occidental
Executed Filipino people
People executed by Japanese occupation forces
People executed by Japan by decapitation
Members of the Philippine Legislature
Members of the National Assembly of the Philippines
Misamis Occidental